Lagenaria sphaerica is a herbaceous climber in the family Cucurbitaceae. It is commonly known as the wild melon.

These plants are found in low-lying areas from the Eastern Cape of South Africa to East Africa. The may grow along river floodplains or up into the canopy of riparian forests. They may also be found in coastal dune vegetation.

These plants produce large white flowers which attract many insects. The melon gourd is green and flecked with white.

In Tanzania only the male flowers produce nectar, which is fed on by the Eastern Olive Sunbird, but the actual pollinators carpenter bees in the genus Xylocopa; female individuals mimic the males and are nectarless (Ollerton & Nuttman 2013).

References

Ollerton, J. & Nuttman, C. (2013) Aggressive displacement of Xylocopa nigrita carpenter bees from flowers of Lagenaria sphaerica (Cucurbitaceae) by territorial male Eastern Olive Sunbirds (Cyanomitra olivacea) in Tanzania.  Journal of Pollination Ecology 11: 21–26
 Pooley, E. (1998). A Field Guide to Wild Flowers: KwaZulu-Natal and the Eastern Region. .

External links

 

Cucurbitoideae
Flora of South Africa
Crops originating from South Africa
Creepers of South Africa
Eastern Cape